The Ellis Group is a stratigraphical unit of Bajocian-Oxfordian age in Alberta, Saskatchewan, Montana and Wyoming in the Western Canadian Sedimentary Basin. It takes the name from Fort Ellis, Montana, and was first described in outcrop in the Rocky Creek Canyon by A.C. Peale in 1893.

Lithology 
The Ellis Group is composed of shale and sandstones deposited in a marine and transitional environment.

Hydrocarbon production 
Oil is produced from the Sawtooth Formation in southeastern Alberta.

Distribution 
The Ellis Group laterally occurs in the subsurface in southern Alberta and northern and central Montana.

Subdivisions 
The Ellis Group includes the following formations, from top to bottom:

Relationship to other units 
The Ellis Group is unconformably overlain by the shales and sandstones of the Mannville Group and rests on the carbonates of the Rundle Group. It grades westwards to the shales of the Fernie Group, and eastwards to the shale, sandstones and limestones of the Vanguard and Shaunavon Formations.

References 

Geologic groups of North America
Geologic groups of Montana
Geologic groups of Wyoming
Geologic formations of Canada
Geologic formations of the United States
Jurassic Canada
Jurassic Montana
Jurassic United States
Bajocian Stage
Oxfordian Stage
Shale formations
Sandstone formations
Stratigraphy of Alberta
Stratigraphy of Montana
Stratigraphy of Saskatchewan